Ibón Idigoras (born 8 November 1979) is a Spanish snowboarder. He competed in the men's snowboard cross event at the 2006 Winter Olympics.

References

1979 births
Living people
Spanish male snowboarders
Olympic snowboarders of Spain
Snowboarders at the 2006 Winter Olympics
People from Zarautz
21st-century Spanish people